Insurge Pictures was an American production company that was the specialty label belonging to the American film studio Paramount Pictures.

Beginnings
In March 2010, it was announced that Paramount Pictures would launch a new division named Insurge Pictures, which would produce micro-budget films based on Paramount's success with the micro-budget Paranormal Activity. The first film produced by Paramount Insurge was Never Say Never (2010), a documentary film featuring Justin Bieber. Prior to the release of the film, Insurge released  "Grease: The Sing-A-Long," which had a limited release.

In 2011, it was announced that Insurge wrapped an at the time untitled project about a destination wedding. The film, which was released on May 22, 2015 was eventually titled Drunk Wedding and was shelved for years prior to the release. In January 2011, it was announced Insurge was releasing The Devil Inside.

In 2012, Insurge released The Loved Ones, and Katy Perry: Part of Me. Insurge also produced a mockumentary reality series, Burning Love, which was re-adapted in 2013 into a regular series for E!. In 2015, it was announced that Insurge would be releasing Area 51 and Drunk Wedding on May 15, and May 22, 2015 in a limited release exclusively at Drafthouse Theaters and through video on demand providers. Both projects were shelved prior to their releases.

In May 2015, President Amy Powell was stripped of responsibility for the division, with Insurge being transferred as a label within Paramount and its staff absorbed into its feature film team, reporting to recently appointed Paramount Motion Pictures Group President Marc Evans.

Films

References 

Paramount Pictures
Mass media companies established in 2010
Mass media companies disestablished in 2015
Film production companies of the United States
Film distributors of the United States